The women's 200 metres competition at the 1956 Summer Olympics in Melbourne, Australia was held at the Olympic Stadium on November 29–30.

Summary
At home, Australia got three athletes into the final, led by already 100 metres champion Betty Cuthbert.  Running in lane 5, with 100 metres silver medalist Christa Stubnick to her outside in lane 6, Cuthbert took an early lead making up the stagger on Stubnick more than 20 metres before the end of the turn.  By the time they were all on the straightaway, she had a meter lead on Stubnick with no competition coming from the inside.  She widened it to three metres by the finish.  The race for bronze was more competitive as the other semi-final winner, June Foulds had opened up a metre lead over the other two Australians through the turn, but both were gaining.  50 metres out, Norma Croker caught Foulds marginally ahead, but Marlene Mathews-Willard continued to gain, opening up a meter on her compatriot by the finish, to take bronze.  It was the same finish order as the 100 metres.

Competition format
The women's 200 metres competition started with six heats, where the fastest two from each heat qualified to one of the two semifinals groups. The three fastest runners from each semifinals group advanced to the final.

Records
Prior to the competition, the existing World and Olympic records were as follows.

Results

Heats
Heat 1

Heat 2

Heat 3

Heat 4

Heat 5

Heat 6

Semifinals
Group 1

Group 2

Final

References

Athletics at the 1956 Summer Olympics
200 metres at the Olympics
1956 in women's athletics
Ath